Edward Regis, Jr (born 1944) — known as Ed Regis — is an American philosopher, educator and author.  He specializes in books and articles about science, philosophy and intelligence.  His topics have included nanotechnology, transhumanism and biological warfare.  His articles have appeared in several scientific magazines, including Scientific American, Harper's Magazine, Wired, Discover, The New York Times, Journal of Philosophy, Ethics and the American Philosophical Quarterly.

Personal
Regis was born in 1944.  He received a Ph.D in Philosophy from New York University.  Regis and his wife live in the mountains near Camp David, in Maryland.

Works

Editor

Original works

References

Further reading
Reviews

American science writers
Living people
1944 births